Dave De Ruff (born April 10, 1961) is an American rower. He competed in the men's coxless pair event at the 1984 Summer Olympics.

References

External links
 

1961 births
Living people
American male rowers
Olympic rowers of the United States
Rowers at the 1984 Summer Olympics
Sportspeople from Santa Ana, California
Pan American Games medalists in rowing
Pan American Games gold medalists for the United States
Rowers at the 1983 Pan American Games
Medalists at the 1983 Pan American Games